The 2007 British GT season consisted of a fourteen-round series of sports car racing in the British GT Championship. Each race meeting consisted of two one-hour endurance races, except for those at Snetterton and Silverstone, which were both single two-hour races. All of the races took place in England in 2007. Two classes raced: the more powerful GT3 and the less powerful GTC class. This was the last time the GTC class raced, before the inception of the FIA GT4 class takes over in 2008.

Entry list

Calendar

Championship standings
 Competitors must have completed 70% of the race distance covered by the class winner to be classified.
Points were awarded as follows:

Drivers' Championships

GT3

† — Drivers did not finish the race, but were classified as they completed over 90% of the race distance.

GTC

Teams' Championships

GT3

References

External links
British GT website
British GT 2007 Gallery

GT season
British GT Championship seasons